An inside director is a member of the board of directors of a corporation who is also a member of the corporation's management, almost always a corporate officer.

References

board of directors
business occupations